Nick Flocas (born 13 June 1999) is a Greece international rugby league footballer who plays for the Ipswich Jets in the Queensland Cup.

Playing career
In 2022, Flocas was named in the Greece squad for the 2021 Rugby League World Cup, the first ever Greek Rugby League squad to compete in a World Cup.

References

External links
Greek profile

1999 births
Living people
Australian rugby league players
Australian people of Greek descent
Rugby league second-rows
Rugby league locks
Rugby league players from Melbourne
Greece national rugby league team players
Sportsmen from Victoria (Australia)